The following is the 1968–69 network television schedule for the three major English language commercial broadcast networks in the United States. The schedule covers primetime hours from September 1968 through August 1969. The schedule is followed by a list per network of returning series, new series, and series cancelled after the 1967–68 season.

New fall series are highlighted in bold.

Each of the 30 highest-rated shows is listed with its rank and rating as determined by Nielsen Media Research.

 Yellow indicates the programs in the top 10 for the season.
 Cyan indicates the programs in the top 20 for the season.
 Magenta indicates the programs in the top 30 for the season.

National Educational Television (NET) was in operation, but the schedule was set by each local station.

Sunday

Monday

Tuesday

Wednesday 

(*) Turn-On aired in this time period on February 5, 1969, only.

Tarzan on CBS consisted of reruns from the 1966-68 NBC series.

Thursday

Friday

Saturday

By network

ABC

Returning Series
The ABC Sunday Night Movie
The ABC Wednesday Night Movie
The Avengers
Bewitched
The Big Valley
The Dating Game
The F.B.I.
Felony Squad
The Flying Nun
The Guns of Will Sonnett
Happening '69
The Hollywood Palace
It Takes a Thief
Judd, for the Defense
The King Family Show
The Lawrence Welk Show
Let's Make a Deal
The Newlywed Game
N.Y.P.D.
Operation: Entertainment
Peyton Place
Saga of Western Man
That Girl

New Series
Animal World *
The Dick Cavett Show *
The Don Rickles Show
The Generation Gap *
Here Come the Brides
The Johnny Cash Show *
Journey to the Unknown
Land of the Giants
The Mod Squad
The Outcasts
That's Life
This is Tom Jones *
The Ugliest Girl in Town
What's It All About, World *

Not returning from 1967–68:
ABC Scope
Batman
Cowboy in Africa
Custer
Dream House
Garrison's Gorillas
Good Company
Hondo
The Invaders
Iron Horse
Man in a Suitcase
Off to See the Wizard
The Rat Patrol
The Second Hundred Years
Voyage to the Bottom of the Sea

CBS

Returning Series
The 21st Century
Animal World
The Beverly Hillbillies
The Carol Burnett Show
CBS News Hour
CBS Playhouse
CBS Thursday Night Movie
CBS Friday Night Movies
Daktari
The Ed Sullivan Show
Family Affair
Gentle Ben
Gomer Pyle, U.S.M.C.
Green Acres
Gunsmoke
Hogan's Heroes
The Jackie Gleason Show
The Jonathan Winters Show
Lassie
Mannix
Mission: Impossible
My Three Sons
Petticoat Junction
The Red Skelton Hour
The Smothers Brothers Comedy Hour
Turn-On
The Wild Wild West

New Series
60 Minutes
Blondie
Carol Burnett Presents the Jimmie Rodgers Show *
The Doris Day Show
The Glen Campbell Goodtime Hour *
The Good Guys
Hawaii Five-O
Hee Haw *
Here's Lucy
Lancer
The Liberace Show *
Mayberry R.F.D.
The Queen & I *

Not returning from 1967–68:
The Andy Griffith Show
Cimarron Strip
Dundee and the Culhane
Good Morning, World
He & She
Lost in Space
The Lucy Show
Premiere
The Prisoner

NBC

Returning Series
Bonanza
Daniel Boone
Dean Martin Presents the Golddiggers
The Dean Martin Show
Dragnet 1969
Get Smart
The High Chaparral
I Dream of Jeannie
Ironside
The Jerry Lewis Show
Kraft Music Hall
The Mothers-in-Law
Mutual of Omaha's Wild Kingdom
NBC Monday Night at the Movies
NBC Saturday Night at the Movies
Rowan & Martin's Laugh-In
The Saint
Star Trek
The Virginian
Walt Disney's Wonderful World of Color

New Series
The Beautiful Phyllis Diller Show
Columbo
The Ghost & Mrs. Muir
Julia
My Friend Tony *
The Name of the Game
The New Adventures of Huckleberry Finn
The Outsider

Not returning from 1967–68:
Accidental Family
Actuality Specials
American Profile
The Bell Telephone Hour
The Champions
The Danny Thomas Hour
Hollywood Squares
I Spy
The Man from U.N.C.L.E.
Maya
The Monkees
NBC News Reports
Run for Your Life
Tarzan

Note: The * indicates that the program was introduced in midseason.

References

 Castleman, H. & Podrazik, W. (1982). Watching TV: Four Decades of American Television. New York: McGraw-Hill. 314 pp.
 McNeil, Alex. Total Television. Fourth edition. New York: Penguin Books. .
 Brooks, Tim & Marsh, Earle (1994). The Complete Directory to Prime Time Network TV Shows (3rd ed.). New York: Ballantine. .

United States primetime network television schedules
1968 in American television
1969 in American television